Love, Speed and Thrills is a 1915 American short comedy film produced by Mack Sennett, directed by Walter Wright, starring Mack Swain, Chester Conklin and Minta Durfee, and featuring Billy Gilbert, Charley Chase and the Keystone Cops in supporting roles.

Plot summary 

Love, Speed and Thrills involves a loving husband and a wife-stealing wolf, both after the same woman.

Cast 
Mack Swain as Ambrose
Minta Durfee as Ambrose's Wife
Chester Conklin as Mr. Walrus
Billy Gilbert
Josef Swickard as Chief of the Keystone Kops
Charley Chase

External links 

1915 films
1915 comedy films
1910s English-language films
American silent short films
American black-and-white films
Films directed by Mack Sennett
1915 short films
Silent American comedy films
American comedy short films
1910s American films